Walter C. Sweet  (17 October 1927 in Denver, Colorado – 4 December 2015 in Tucson, Arizona) was an American paleontologist.

He was a Chief Panderer of the Pander Society, an informal organisation founded in 1967 for the promotion of the study of conodont palaeontology.

In 1984, he was president of the Paleontological Society, an international organisation devoted to the promotion of paleontology.

In 1979, he described the conodont genus Culumbodina. In 1988, he described the conodont order Proconodontida and the conodont family Gnathodontidae.

Awards and tributes 
He received the Pander Medal, the Paleontological Society Medal in 1994 and the Raymond C. Moore Medal in 1988.
 
The conodont genus Sweetognathus is named in his honour.

References 

 Stig Bergström and Walter C. Sweet, The generic concept in conodont taxonomy. Proceedings North American Paleontological Convention, 1, 1969, S. 29–42.
 Stig Bergström and Walter C. Sweet, Conodont provinces and biofacies of the Late Ordovician, Geological Society of America Special Papers 196, 1984, S. 69–88
 Stig Bergström and Walter C. Sweet, Conodonts and Biostratigraphic Correlation, Annual Review of Earth and Planetary Sciences, 14, 1986, S. 85–112

External links 
 Walter C. Sweet at the Ohio State University website (retrieved 17 June 2016)

American paleontologists
Conodont specialists
1927 births
2015 deaths
Ohio State University faculty
People from Denver